Jovon Johnson (born November 2, 1983) is a former professional Canadian football defensive back. He was the winner of the CFL's Most Outstanding Defensive Player Award in 2011 while with the Winnipeg Blue Bombers, becoming the first defensive back to win the award in the league. He is also a two-time CFL All-Star and five-time CFL East Division All-Star. In addition, he was a member of the 2007 Saskatchewan Roughriders that won the Grey Cup, though he spent little time on the active roster and finished the last game on the practice roster. He has also been a member of the Pittsburgh Steelers, Erie RiverRats, Ottawa Redblacks, and Montreal Alouettes.

High school and collegiate career
Johnson played his high school ball (and basketball) at Mercyhurst Prep in Erie, Pennsylvania, graduating in 2002. He attended the University of Iowa, a 4-year starter in the Hawkeyes secondary.

Johnson is currently the head coach for North East High School’s football team in North East, Pennsylvania.

Professional career

Pittsburgh Steelers
He was signed by the Pittsburgh Steelers after cornerback Chidi Iwuoma and linebacker Richard Seigler were placed on injured reserve. He spent all of his playing time on the Steelers' special teams recording 1 tackle and 1 assist. He was released from the Pittsburgh Steelers on October 27, 2007.

Saskatchewan Roughriders
The Saskatchewan Roughriders signed Johnson on October 5, 2007, to a contract with and placed on their Developmental Squad. He made his CFL debut October 21, 2007, against the Hamilton Tiger-Cats. In total, he dressed in eight games while playing in two. He was a member of the 95th Grey Cup championship team, although he did not play in the game itself.

Erie RiverRats
At the end of February in 2008, he was signed by his hometown Erie RiverRats of the AIFA. In early 2007 he had signed to play with the city's previous AIFA franchise, the now defunct Erie Freeze, but did not play for the Freeze and decided to play for the Steelers instead.

Winnipeg Blue Bombers
Johnson was signed by the Winnipeg Blue Bombers of the Canadian Football League in April 2008 and started 17 of 18 games during the 2008 CFL season. He led the Bombers in defensive tackles with 57 and added 3 INTs.

He then returned to RiverRats for the 2009 AIFA season following a contract signing in January 2009. He was still under contract in the CFL however the season starts later in the year which would allow him to play in the AIFA. After only one game, it was found out that there was a clause in Johnson's contract with the Winnipeg Blue Bombers that prevents him from playing with any other team. With that, he returned to Winnipeg.

The 2011 Winnipeg Blue Bombers season proved to be a successful one for Johnson, helping to lead the Bombers to their first division title in ten years. He was part of a noteworthy Bombers' defence that had self-titled itself 'Swaggerville' and was named the CFL East Division's most outstanding defensive player. Following this, Johnson was named a CFL East Division all-star for the third consecutive time, as well as being named to his second CFL All-Star team a short time later. Johnson followed this up with an appearance as the first defensive back to win the CFL's Most Outstanding Defensive Player Award. He won the award as the standout player on a team full of talented defensive backs who led the league in fewest passing yards allowed, holding opponents to the lowest pass completion percentage, and led the league with most team interceptions. Johnson accomplished this with teammates such as Jonathan Hefney, Alex Suber, and Brandon Stewart. Johnson continued to play at a high level for the 2012 and 2013 seasons. Through 6 seasons with the Blue Bombers, Johnson amassed 363 tackles, 8 special teams tackles, 23 interceptions, 8 fumble recoveries and 7 defensive touchdowns. Following the 2013 Johnson, age 30, was not re-signed by the Bombers, becoming a free agent on February 11, 2014.

Ottawa Redblacks
On February 12, 2014, Johnson signed with the Ottawa Redblacks of the Canadian Football League. He recorded the first two sacks of his career during a forgettable 2014 season that saw the expansion club finish 2-16. The next year, however, the Redblacks finished first in the CFL East Division and Johnson was named an Eastern All-Star for the fifth time in his career.

Montreal Alouettes
Johnson was signed by the Montreal Alouettes on February 10, 2016. Johnson played in all 18 games during his first season with the Alouettes. Johnson was released by the Alouettes on June 17, 2017 as teams trimmed their rosters down to 46 players for the start of the season.

Saskatchewan Roughriders (II)
On June 19, 2017 the Roughriders announced that Johnson had been added to the team's practice roster. Johnson dressed for all 18 games for the Riders and contributed with 39 defensive tackles, two interceptions and one forced fumble. Following the season Johnson and the Riders agreed to a contract extension.

Johnson signed a one-day contract with the Winnipeg Blue Bombers on March 2, 2020, to retire with the team.

Statistics

References

Further reading
 
 Ottawa Redblacks bio

1983 births
Living people
American football defensive backs
Canadian football defensive backs
African-American players of American football
African-American players of Canadian football
Canadian Football League Most Outstanding Defensive Player Award winners
Erie RiverRats players
Iowa Hawkeyes football players
Ottawa Redblacks players
Sportspeople from Erie, Pennsylvania
Pittsburgh Steelers players
Players of American football from Pennsylvania
Saskatchewan Roughriders players
Winnipeg Blue Bombers players
Montreal Alouettes players
21st-century African-American sportspeople
20th-century African-American people